Greenhouse Sports is a British charity which aims to develop social, emotional and physical skills for young people in London through sports programmes.

The organisation was founded as Greenhouse Schools Project in 2002 when Chief Executive and founder, Michael de Giorgio, set up a multisports pilot during the school holidays. In 2004, the organisation then moved their programmes full-time into schools. The organisation was renamed to Greenhouse Charity before being again renamed to Greenhouse Sports.

References

External links

Education by subject
Organisations based in London
Sports organizations established in 2002
2002 establishments in England